Haley Creek is a stream in the U.S. state of Tennessee.

Haley Creek was the name of a pioneer settler. A variant name was "Haleys Creek".

References

Rivers of Henderson County, Tennessee
Rivers of Tennessee